Zhuge Jin (174 – July or August 241), courtesy name Ziyu, was a Chinese military general and politician of the state of Eastern Wu during the Three Kingdoms period of China. Born in the late Eastern Han dynasty, Zhuge Jin started his career in the 200s as an official under the warlord Sun Quan, who later became the founding emperor of Eastern Wu in the Three Kingdoms period. In 215, he served as Sun Quan's representative in a territorial dispute over southern Jing Province between Sun Quan and his ally, Liu Bei. In 219, he joined Sun Quan's general Lü Meng in an invasion of Liu Bei's territories in Jing Province after Sun Quan broke the Sun–Liu alliance. He was subsequently appointed as a general and commandery administrator. Before the Battle of Xiaoting of 221–222, Zhuge Jin attempted to dissuade Liu Bei from going to war with Sun Quan but was unsuccessful. The battle ultimately concluded with victory for Sun Quan's side; both sides made peace later and reestablished an alliance between the Eastern Wu and Shu Han states against their rival state, Cao Wei. From 222 until his death in 241, despite being rather incompetent in military affairs, Zhuge Jin served as one of Eastern Wu's top generals and participated in some battles against Cao Wei forces.

Although Zhuge Jin was not as brilliant in statecraft and military strategy as his more famous brother Zhuge Liang, he was known throughout his life for his virtuous character. He had a reputation for conducting himself with grace and decorum, and for being thoughtful, magnanimous and tactful. In return, he gained Sun Quan's trust, and Sun Quan never questioned his loyalty towards him. Zhuge Jin was also known for helping to mediate conflicts between Sun Quan and his subjects, including Zhu Zhi and Yu Fan.

Family background
Zhuge Jin's ancestral home (and probably birthplace too) was in Yangdu County, Langya Commandery, which is located in present-day Yinan County or Yishui County, Shandong. There are two other accounts of his ancestral origins in the Wu Shu and Fengsu Tong.

The Wu Shu recorded that his ancestral family name was actually Ge and his ancestors were originally from Zhu County (諸縣; southwest of present-day Zhucheng, Shandong) before they settled in Yangdu County. As there was already another Ge family in Yangdu County before they came, the locals referred to the newcomers as the Zhuge – combining Zhu (County) and Ge – to distinguish them from the other Ge family. Over time, Zhuge Liang's ancestors adopted Zhuge as their family name.

The Fengsu Tong recorded that his ancestor was Ge Ying, a general who served under Chen Sheng, the rebel king who led the Dazexiang uprising against the Qin dynasty. Chen Sheng later executed Ge Ying. During the early Western Han dynasty, Emperor Wen considered that Ge Ying was unjustly put to death, so he enfeoffed Ge Ying's grandson as the Marquis of Zhu County to honour Ge Ying. Over time, Ge Ying's descendants adopted Zhuge as their family name by combining Zhu (County) and Ge.

The earliest known ancestor of Zhuge Jin who bore the family name Zhuge was Zhuge Feng, a Western Han dynasty official who served as Colonel-Director of Retainers under Emperor Yuan ( 48–33 BCE). Zhuge Jin's father, Zhuge Gui, whose courtesy name was Jungong, served as an assistant official in Taishan Commandery (泰山郡; around present-day Tai'an, Shandong) in the late Eastern Han dynasty under Emperor Ling ( 168–189 CE).

Zhuge Jin had two younger brothers and two sisters. His brothers were Zhuge Liang and Zhuge Jun. One of their two sisters married Kuai Qi while the other married Pang Shanmin, a cousin of Pang Tong.

Early life
In his youth, Zhuge Jin visited Luoyang, the imperial capital, where he studied classical texts such as the Mao Commentary on the Classic of Poetry, Book of Documents, and Zuo Zhuan. When his mother died, he went home and dutifully performed filial mourning. He also treated his stepmother in a courteous and respectful manner, which earned him fame for his filial piety.

When chaos broke out throughout China towards the end of the Eastern Han dynasty, Zhuge Jin fled from home and headed south to the Jiangdong region for shelter. He travelled around the region with Bu Zhi and Yan Jun, and they earned themselves fine reputations as learned men. At the time ( 200s), Sun Quan had recently succeeded his deceased elder brother, Sun Ce, as the warlord ruling over the territories in Jiangdong. Hong Zi, a brother-in-law of Sun Quan (who married an elder half-sister of Quan's)  noticed and recognised Zhuge Jin's talent so he recommended Zhuge Jin to serve under Sun Quan. Sun Quan treated Zhuge Jin, Lu Su and other talents who came to join him like honoured guests. Zhuge Jin then started his career under Sun Quan as a Chief Clerk. Later, he was reassigned to the position of a Central Major.

Sun–Liu territorial dispute

Sometime between June and August 215, Sun Quan sent Zhuge Jin as his representative to visit his ally, Liu Bei, who had recently seized control of Yi Province (covering present-day Sichuan and Chongqing). Zhuge Jin's task was to ask Liu Bei to "return" the territories in southern Jing Province (covering present-day Hubei and Hunan) to Sun Quan, according to an earlier agreement that Liu Bei would only use Jing Province as a temporary base and would return them to Sun Quan once he found another base. However, Liu Bei refused and said he would return the territories after he seized Liang Province.

Sun Quan ignored Liu Bei and sent his officials to assume office in the three commanderies of Changsha, Lingling and Guiyang in southern Jing Province. However, Guan Yu, Liu Bei's general in charge of defending those territories, drove Sun Quan's officials away. An enraged Sun Quan then ordered his general Lü Meng to lead 20,000 troops to seize the three commanderies by force. After a standoff between both sides and tense negotiations, Liu Bei agreed to divide southern Jing Province between his and Sun Quan's domains along the Xiang River: Liu Bei would keep Nan, Lingling and Wuling commanderies in the west, while Sun Quan would take Changsha, Jiangxia and Guiyang commanderies in the east.

The territorial dispute was resolved by mid August to early September 215. Sun Quan then sent Zhuge Jin as his representative to visit Liu Bei again. During this trip, Zhuge Jin met his second brother Zhuge Liang, who was serving as an adviser to Liu Bei. They refrained from meeting each other in private to dispel any suspicions that either of them was secretly collaborating with his brother against his lord.

Role in the Wu–Shu conflict

Wu invasion of Jing Province

In 219, Sun Quan broke the Sun–Liu alliance and ordered his general Lü Meng to lead troops to seize Liu Bei's territories in southern Jing Province, which were guarded by Liu Bei's general Guan Yu, who was away at the Battle of Fancheng at the time. Zhuge Jin participated in the invasion, which turned out successful. Guan Yu was eventually captured and executed by Sun Quan's forces. Lü Meng died of illness a few months after the victory. In recognition of Zhuge Jin's contributions during the campaign, Sun Quan enfeoffed him as the Marquis of Xuancheng and appointed him as General Who Pacifies the South to replace Lü Meng as the Administrator of Nan Commandery (南郡; around present-day Jingzhou, Hubei), the former headquarters of Liu Bei's territories in Jing Province. Zhuge Jin was stationed at Gong'an County, one of the key counties in Nan Commandery.

In 220, Cao Pi usurped the throne from Emperor Xian, ended the Eastern Han dynasty, and established the state of Cao Wei (or Wei) with himself as the new emperor. This event marked the end of the Eastern Han dynasty and the beginning of the Three Kingdoms period in China. Sun Quan pledged nominal allegiance to Cao Pi and became a vassal of Wei. In return, Cao Pi awarded Sun Quan the title "King of Wu" and granted him autonomous rule over the Jiangdong (or Wu) territories. A year later, Liu Bei declared himself emperor and established the state of Shu Han (or Shu) to contest Cao Pi's legitimacy.

Battle of Xiaoting

In 221, when Liu Bei started the Battle of Xiaoting against Sun Quan to retake his lost territories in southern Jing Province, Sun Quan sent Zhuge Jin as his representative to meet Liu Bei and begin peace talks. Zhuge Jin told Liu Bei: 

In his annotations to Zhuge Jin's biography in the Sanguozhi, the fifth-century historian Pei Songzhi rebutted Zhuge Jin's speech to Liu Bei. From Pei Songzhi's point of view, Liu Bei had good reason(s) to go to war with Sun Quan because Sun Quan thwarted his attempts to revive the Eastern Han dynasty when he broke the Sun–Liu alliance and seized Jing Province. Pei Songzhi also noted that Liu Bei's relationship with Guan Yu was so close that it could not be described in words. He remarked that if Liu Bei and Guan Yu's relationship were to be described in words in the Sanguozhi, it would take up so much space that it becomes a waste of space.

The Battle of Xiaoting ended in late 222 with victory for Sun Quan's forces, which were led by Sun Quan's general Lu Xun. Liu Bei retreated to Baidicheng (in present-day Fengjie County, Chongqing) after his disastrous defeat and died of illness in early 223.

Battles against Wei
In late 222, Sun Quan, who was previously a vassal king under the Cao Wei state, broke ties with the Wei emperor Cao Pi and declared himself the independent ruler of his Eastern Wu state. He promoted Zhuge Jin to General of the Left, granted him acting imperial authority, and ordered him to station at Gong'an County to oversee the Wu defences in southern Jing Province. He also enfeoffed Zhuge Jin as the Marquis of Wanling.

Battle of Jiangling (223)

Between 222 and 223, the Wei generals Cao Zhen and Xiahou Shang led their troops to attack the Wu-controlled Jiangling County (江陵縣; in present-day Jingzhou, Hubei), which was defended by the Wu general Zhu Ran. At the same time, another detachment of Wei troops occupied Zhongzhou, an island in the Yangtze River near Jiangling County. When Zhuge Jin heard about it, he led Wu forces from Gong'an County to reinforce Zhu Ran. However, he turned out to be an incompetent military commander as he showed weak leadership, adopted a slow and reactive approach, and spent too much time on discussion and planning as opposed to actively seizing opportunities to attack the enemy. Due to his incompetence, the siege dragged on, and Sun Quan became rather unhappy with him. The siege on Jiangling County was eventually lifted after the Wu general Pan Zhang came up with a plan to burn down the Wei forces' pontoon bridges and drive them back. Although Zhuge Jin did not make any significant achievements in the battle, he received credit for contributing to the Wu forces' overall success in defending Jiangling County.

Battle of Xiangyang (226)
Between September and early November 226, following Cao Pi's death and Cao Rui's accession to the Wei throne, Sun Quan personally led Wu forces to attack the Wei-controlled Jiangxia Commandery, which was defended by the Wei general Wen Ping. At the same time, he ordered Zhuge Jin and Zhang Ba to lead a separate Wu army to attack the Wei-controlled city of Xiangyang. However, Zhuge Jin lost the battle against Wei forces led by Sima Yi. Zhang Ba was killed in battle and the Wu army lost over 1,000 men. In the meantime, Sun Quan mistakenly believed that Wei reinforcements had arrived at Jiangxia Commandery, so he pulled back his troops and returned to Wu.

Battle of Xiangyang (234)

Between mid June and early September 234, Sun Quan personally led a 100,000 strong Wu army to attack the Wei fortress of Xincheng at Hefei. At the same time, he ordered Lu Xun and Zhuge Jin to lead another 10,000 troops to attack Xiangyang, and Sun Shao and Zhang Cheng to lead their troops to attack Huaiyin County in Guangling Commandery (around present-day Huai'an, Jiangsu). The Wei general Man Chong, who oversaw Xincheng's defences, successfully repelled the Wu invaders and killed Sun Quan's nephew Sun Tai in battle. Sun Quan eventually ordered a retreat when a plague broke out in his army and after he heard that the Wei emperor Cao Rui was personally leading reinforcements to Hefei. Sun Shao and Zhang Cheng also pulled back from Guangling Commandery after learning of Sun Quan's retreat from Hefei.

In the meantime, Lu Xun ordered a close aide, Han Bian, to deliver a report to Sun Quan. On the journey back, Han Bian was captured by a Wei patrol. When Zhuge Jin learnt of Han Bian's capture, he became fearful so he wrote to Lu Xun and urged him to make a hasty retreat from Xiangyang. Lu Xun did not respond, and he instructed his men to plant turnips and peas while he played weiqi and other games with his officers as though nothing had happened. Zhuge Jin believed that Lu Xun knew what he was doing so he did not panic. He came to see Lu Xun, who told him: "The enemy knows that His Majesty (Sun Quan) has withdrawn his forces, so they have no worries and will concentrate their attacks on us. Besides, they have already stationed troops at critical positions and are poised to strike. Hence, we should remain composed and calm our men, after which we will have a change of plans and prepare to withdraw. If we display signs of retreat now, the enemy will think that we are afraid and will definitely attack us, resulting in defeat for us."

Lu Xun then secretly conveyed his plan to Zhuge Jin and ordered him to supervise the fleet of vessels on which they would sail back to Wu, while he gathered his troops and headed towards Xiangyang. The Wei forces had been wary of Lu Xun all this while so they immediately retreated back into the city when they saw Lu Xun's army approaching. Lu Xun organised his men in an orderly manner and instructed them to pretend to prepare for an attack on Xiangyang. By then, Zhuge Jin and the fleet had shown up, so Lu Xun and his forces progressively retreated to the vessels and left. The Wei forces in Xiangyang did not dare to make any move.

Later life and death
In 229, after Sun Quan declared himself emperor of Eastern Wu, he appointed Zhuge Jin as General-in-Chief, Left Protector-General, and as the nominal Governor of Yu Province.

After the Lü Yi scandal ended in 238, Sun Quan sent a personal representative to meet all his senior generals and apologise to them, as well as to seek their views on how he could reform the bureaucracy to prevent corrupt officials like Lü Yi from abusing their powers again. However, to his disappointment, Zhuge Jin and other generals such as Bu Zhi, Zhu Ran and Lü Dai gave the excuse that they were not in charge of civil affairs and said that civil affairs were best left to civil officials such as Lu Xun and Pan Jun. Sun Quan then wrote an emotional letter to them, blaming himself for the mistakes and urging them to give him honest advice and point out his mistakes. After receiving the letter, Zhuge Jin was so moved that he wrote a clear, detailed and well-reasoned response to the Lü Yi scandal and Sun Quan's queries.

Zhuge Jin died in July or August 241 at the age of 68 (by East Asian age reckoning). Before his death, he expressed a desire to be dressed in plain clothes and to have a simple funeral.

Relationship with Sun Quan
Throughout his life, Zhuge Jin was known for conducting himself with grace and decorum, and for being thoughtful and magnanimous. These traits earned him much admiration and respect from his contemporaries. Sun Quan also regarded him highly and often consulted him on important issues.

Zhuge Jin was known for being tactful whenever he spoke to Sun Quan, be it giving advice or small talk. He spoke in a toned-down and indirect manner, gave only a brief outline of what he wanted to say, and stopped immediately once he sensed that Sun Quan got his point. When he realised that Sun Quan's views were at odds with his, he would subtly change the topic of the conversation and use other topics as analogies to persuade Sun Quan to see things from his point of view. He was successful as Sun Quan understood his views better and became more receptive of them.

After the Battle of Xiaoting of 221–222, someone secretly reported to Sun Quan that Zhuge Jin had sent a close aide to speak with Liu Bei. Sun Quan did not suspect Zhuge Jin's loyalty towards him and instead remarked, "I have made an oath with Ziyu. As long as Ziyu doesn't let me down, I won't let him down."

The Jiang Biao Zhuan recorded that when Zhuge Jin was serving as the Administrator of Nan Commandery, someone secretly reported to Sun Quan that Zhuge Jin had covert dealings with Liu Bei. When Lu Xun heard of such rumours, he wrote a memorial to Sun Quan to speak up for Zhuge Jin and reassure his lord that Zhuge Jin was loyal towards him. Sun Quan wrote a reply to Lu Xun as follows:

Mediating conflicts between Sun Quan and his subjects
Apart from being one of Sun Quan's most trusted subjects, Zhuge Jin was also known for helping to mediate conflicts between his lord and his subjects on a number of occasions as follows.

Zhu Zhi
Zhu Zhi was the official who recommended Sun Quan as a xiaolian (civil service candidate) to serve in the government when Sun Quan was still in his youth. After Sun Quan became the warlord ruling over the Jiangdong territories, Zhu Zhi served under Sun Quan and was held in high regard. Later, for some reason, Sun Quan became unhappy with Zhu Zhi but he could not bring himself to scold the latter, out of respect for him. Zhuge Jin noticed Sun Quan's frustration and figured out why. However, he kept quiet and decided to use an indirect method to help Sun Quan resolve the problem. He set up a hypothetical scenario similar to the conundrum Sun Quan faced, asked Sun Quan questions and guided his thoughts, and wrote them down as Sun Quan spoke. Once they were done, he presented his writing to Sun Quan, who was so pleased after reading it that he remarked: "You have helped me resolve my frustration. Yan Hui spoke of promoting harmony among people as a virtue. Isn't this an example of that?"

Yin Mo
On one occasion, Sun Quan got angry at Yin Mo, a colonel serving under him, and accused him of committing an offence so severe that Sun Quan's other subjects were shocked. When his subjects pleaded with him to spare Yin Mo, Sun Quan became even more furious and he started quarrelling with them. Only Zhuge Jin remained silent. Sun Quan noticed it and asked him: "Ziyu, why are you the only person who hasn't spoken?" Zhuge Jin then left his seat, stood up and said:  Sun Quan felt deeply saddened after hearing Zhuge Jin's words. He then said: "I'll let him off because of you."

Yu Fan
When Yu Fan, one of Sun Quan's advisers, was banished to the remote Jiao Province for his disrespectful and offensive behaviour, Zhuge Jin not only repeatedly tried to persuade Sun Quan to pardon Yu Fan, but was also the only one among Sun Quan's subjects who spoke up for Yu Fan.

Later, Yu Fan wrote a letter to a relative as follows:

Zhou Yin
Sometime between 229 and 239, Zhou Yin, a son of Zhou Yu, committed an offence and was exiled to Luling Commandery (廬陵郡; around present-day Ji'an, Jiangxi) as punishment. In 239, Zhuge Jin and Bu Zhi wrote a memorial to Sun Quan, requesting for Zhou Yin to be pardoned and restored of his titles on account of his father's contributions. Sun Quan was reluctant to do so, as he noted the severity of Zhou Yin's offence and said that Zhou Yin had not shown any sign of remorse. However, after much urging from Zhuge Jin, Bu Zhi, Zhu Ran and Quan Cong, Sun Quan eventually agreed, but Zhou Yin had already died of illness in exile by then.

Family and descendants

During Zhuge Jin's lifetime, his family was one of the most illustrious families in China. While he was serving as General-in-Chief in Wu, his second brother Zhuge Liang served as the Imperial Chancellor of Wu's ally state, Shu, and their cousin Zhuge Dan served as a general in Wu and Shu's rival state, Wei. Two of Zhuge Jin's sons, Zhuge Ke and Zhuge Rong, also served as generals in Wu.

Although Zhuge Jin was not as talented and brilliant as his better known brother Zhuge Liang, he was noted for his exemplary conduct and virtuous character. After his wife died, he did not promote his favourite concubine to the status of his formal spouse to replace his deceased wife. He also did not show any favouritism towards his son(s) born to his concubine.

Zhuge Jin's eldest son, Zhuge Ke, was not only famous in Wu, but also highly regarded by Sun Quan. However, Zhuge Jin disapproved of Zhuge Ke's behaviour, treated him coldly, and constantly worried that his eldest son would bring doom to their family.  After Zhuge Jin died, his third son Zhuge Rong inherited his peerage as the Marquis of Wanling; Zhuge Ke did not inherit his father's peerage because he had already received a peerage of his own. Zhuge Rong also took control of the troops previously under his father's command at Gong'an County.

In 253, Zhuge Ke, who briefly served as a regent for Sun Quan's successor Sun Liang, was overthrown and assassinated in a coup d'état by Sun Jun, a distant relative of Sun Liang. Zhuge Ke's two surviving sons, along with Zhuge Rong and Zhuge Rong's three sons, as well as other members of Zhuge Ke's extended family, were rounded up and executed.

Zhuge Jin's second son, Zhuge Qiao, was adopted by his uncle Zhuge Liang because Zhuge Liang initially had no son and needed a male heir. Zhuge Qiao came to serve in Shu and died in 228. His son, Zhuge Pan, also served as an official in Shu. However, after Zhuge Jin's descendants were purged in 253, Zhuge Pan reverted to his original lineage and moved to Wu to continue Zhuge Jin's bloodline there. However, Zhuge Pan was noted to have died young as well. In 264, Zhuge Pan's son Zhuge Xian, who somehow ended up in Wei, was moved to Hedong Commandery along with Zhuge Zhan's second son Zhuge Jing. Jin-era calligrapher Wang Xizhi wrote that he once met Zhuge Xian at Jiankang, and asked him about the situation in Shu. Zhuge replied that Chengdu's city walls, houses and many other buildings were from the Qin era, where they were built by Sima Cuo.

Zhang Cheng, a general serving under Sun Quan, was a friend of Zhuge Jin. When his wife died, his father Zhang Zhao suggested that he marry Zhuge Jin's daughter. Zhang Cheng initially felt awkward about becoming his friend's son-in-law, but eventually agreed after Sun Quan persuaded him to do so. Zhang Cheng and Zhuge Jin's daughter had a daughter, Consort Zhang, who married Sun Quan's third son Sun He.

See also
 Lists of people of the Three Kingdoms

Notes

References
Citations from the Sanguozhi

 Chen, Shou (3rd century). Records of the Three Kingdoms (Sanguozhi).
Citations from the Sanguozhi zhu

 Pei, Songzhi (5th century). Annotations to Records of the Three Kingdoms (Sanguozhi zhu).
Other citations

 
 Luo, Guanzhong (14th century). Romance of the Three Kingdoms (Sanguo Yanyi).
 
 Sima, Qian (1st century BC). Records of the Grand Historian (Shi Ji).
 Xi, Zuochi ( 4th century). Xiangyang Qijiu Ji.

174 births
241 deaths
Eastern Wu politicians
Eastern Wu generals
Generals from Shandong
Han dynasty politicians from Shandong
Officials under Sun Quan
Politicians from Linyi
Political office-holders in Hubei